The Days of Wine and Roses is the second record and the debut full-length album by American alternative rock band The Dream Syndicate. Produced by Chris D. (of the Flesh Eaters/Divine Horsemen), it was recorded in Los Angeles in September 1982 and released later that year on Chris D.'s Ruby Records, which was a division of Slash Records. It was released for the first time on CD in 1993. 2001 and 2015 reissues on CD featured different bonus tracks.

The phrase "days of wine and roses" is originally from the poem "Vitae Summa Brevis" by the English writer Ernest Dowson (1867–1900):

They are not long, the days of wine and roses:
Out of a misty dream
Our path emerges for a while, then closes
Within a dream.

The album is ranked number 99 in Blender's 100 Greatest Indie-Rock Albums Ever.

Track listing
This is the track listing of the original release. Later re-releases have included bonus tracks from the earlier Down There EP, rehearsals, alternate takes, and the 1981 single recorded by 15 Minutes (a Steve Wynn collaboration with members of the Davis, California band Alternate Learning).

All tracks written by Steve Wynn except as noted.

Side One
 "Tell Me When It's Over" – 3:27
 "Definitely Clean" – 3:25
 "That's What You Always Say" – 3:08
 "Then She Remembers" – 4:03
 "Halloween" (Karl Precoda) – 6:29

Side Two
 "When You Smile" – 4:10
 "Until Lately" – 6:50
 "Too Little, Too Late" – 3:17
 "The Days of Wine and Roses" – 7:22

Bonus Tracks (2001 Rhino Records reissue)
 "Sure Thing" (Down There EP version)
 "That's What You Always Say" (Down There EP version)
 "When You Smile" (Down There EP version)
 "Some Kinda Itch" (Down There EP version)
 "Too Little, Too Late" (Rehearsal version)
 "Definitely Clean" (Rehearsal version)
 "That's What You Always Say" (15 Minutes)
 "Last Chance For You" (15 Minutes)

Bonus Tracks (2015 Omnivore CD reissue)
 "Is It Rolling, Bob?" (rehearsal recording)
 "A Reason" (rehearsal recording)
 "Still Holding on to You" (rehearsal recording)
 "Armed with an Empty Gun" (rehearsal recording)
 "Like Mary" (rehearsal recording)
 "Outside the Dream Syndicate" (rehearsal recording)

Personnel
 Steve Wynn – guitar, vocals
 Karl Precoda – guitar
 Kendra Smith – bass, vocal ("Too Little, Too Late")
 Dennis Duck – drums

References 

1982 albums
The Dream Syndicate albums
Ruby Records albums
Rough Trade Records albums